In enzymology, a Hydroxymethylglutaryl-CoA reductase is an enzyme that catalyzes the chemical reaction

 (R)-mevalonate + CoA + 2 NAD+  3-hydroxy-3-methylglutaryl-CoA + 2 NADH + 2 H+

The 3 substrates of this enzyme are (R)-mevalonate, CoA, and NAD+, whereas its 3 products are 3-hydroxy-3-methylglutaryl-CoA, NADH, and H+.

This enzyme belongs to the family of oxidoreductases, specifically those acting on the CH-OH group of donor with NAD+ or NADP+ as acceptor. The systematic name of this enzyme class is (R)-mevalonate:NAD+ oxidoreductase (CoA-acylating). Other names in common use include beta-hydroxy-beta-methylglutaryl coenzyme A reductase, beta-hydroxy-beta-methylglutaryl CoA-reductase, 3-hydroxy-3-methylglutaryl coenzyme A reductase, and hydroxymethylglutaryl coenzyme A reductase.

References

External links 
 

EC 1.1.1
NADH-dependent enzymes
Enzymes of known structure